The 1961 Bulgarian Cup Final was the 21st final of the Bulgarian Cup (in this period the tournament was named Cup of the Soviet Army), and was contested between CSKA Sofia and Spartak Varna on 28 June 1961 at Vasil Levski National Stadium in Sofia. CSKA won the final 3–0.

Match

Details

See also
1960–61 A Group

References

Bulgarian Cup finals
PFC CSKA Sofia matches
Cup Final